In biology a section is a taxonomic rank that is applied differently in botany and zoology.

In botany

Within flora (plants), 'section' refers to a botanical rank below the genus, but above the species:
 Domain > Kingdom > Division > Class > Order > Family > Tribe > Genus > Subgenus > Section > Subsection > Species

In zoology
Within fauna (animals), 'section' refers to a zoological rank below the order, but above the family:

 Domain > Kingdom > Phylum > Class > Order > Section > Family > Tribe > Genus > Species

In bacteriology
The International Code of Nomenclature for Bacteria states that the Section rank is an informal one, between the subgenus and species (as in botany).

References

Botanical nomenclature
Plant taxonomy
Zoological nomenclature
Bacterial nomenclature
Taxa by rank